Moema is an oil painting on canvas created in 1866 by Brazilian artist Victor Meirelles. It depicts the homonym character from the epic poem Caramuru (1781), by Santa Rita Durão. The work does not depict a scene from the poem, but instead Meirelles's personal interpretation of the character's fate, submerging into the water after being rejected by Caramuru.

The painting was shown for the first time in 1866, in the Imperial Academy of Fine Arts. It is a part of the collection of the São Paulo Museum of Art since 1947. Under Beatriz Pimenta Camargo's presidency, the museum obtained funds for the restoration of the painting, considered to be one of the most important ones in its collection.

A preparatory sketch created before the actual painting shows Moema in a different position, as well as a group of natives in the background which are more prominent than the group in the finished painting's background.

Reception 
Counselor Tomaz Gomes dos Santos, director of the Imperial Academy of Fine Arts, stated:

The painting and Meirelles himself also received praise from the Baron Homem de Melo:

References

External links 

 

Paintings in the collection of the São Paulo Museum of Art
1866 paintings
Paintings by Victor Meirelles